The "Barking Dog" is an exothermic chemical reaction that results from the ignition of a mixture of carbon disulfide and nitrous oxide. When ignited in a cylindrical tube, the reaction produces a bright flash and a loud "woof" - reminiscent of a barking dog.

In simple terms, the 'Barking Dog' reaction is a combustion process, in which a fuel (carbon disulfide, CS2) reacts with an oxidizing agent (nitrous oxide, N2O), producing heat and elemental sulfur.  The flame front in the reaction is a zone of very hot, luminous gas, produced by the reactants decomposing.

8 N2O + 4 CS2 → S8 + 4 CO2 + 8 N2

In April 1853, Justus von Liebig performed the demonstration in front of the Bavarian royal family; however, the glass container shattered, and shards of glass inflicted minor injuries on the faces of Queen Therese, her son Prince Luitpold, and Liebig himself.

References

External links
 Barking Dog (slow motion) - Periodic Table of Videos, University of Nottingham
 University of Leeds Barking Dog site
   Elementary Productions: Small scale Barking Dog reaction @  youtube
  Barking Dog Reaction How to Do the Barking Dog Chemistry Demonstration

Chemical reactions
Chemistry classroom experiments
Articles containing video clips